Victor "Skeeter" Teal (born August 10, 1949) is a Canadian retired professional ice hockey right winger who played in one National Hockey League game for the New York Islanders during the 1973–74 NHL season. The rest of his career, which lasted from 1969 to 1977, was spent in various minor leagues. He is the younger brother of Skip Teal, who also played in only one NHL game.

Career statistics

Regular season and playoffs

See also
List of players who played only one game in the NHL

External links

1949 births
Living people
Canadian ice hockey right wingers
Erie Blades players
Fort Worth Texans players
Fort Worth Wings players
Ice hockey people from Ontario
Kansas City Blues players
New Haven Nighthawks players
New York Islanders players
Ontario Hockey Association Senior A League (1890–1979) players
Sportspeople from St. Catharines
St. Catharines Black Hawks players
St. Louis Blues draft picks